Drew Miller (born July 6, 1985) is an American former college and professional football player who was center in the National Football League (NFL).  He played college football for the University of Florida.  He was signed by the NFL's Jacksonville Jaguars as an undrafted free agent in 2008, and also played for the St. Louis Rams.

Early years
Miller was born in Paducah, Kentucky in 1985.  He attended Riverview High School in Sarasota, Florida, where he played high school football for the Riverview Rams.

College career
Miller received an athletic scholarship to attend the University of Florida in Gainesville, Florida, and played for coach Ron Zook and coach Urban Meyer's Florida Gators football teams from 2004 to 2007.  He was a second-team All-Southeastern Conference (SEC) selection in 2006 and an honorable mention All-SEC pick in 2007.  In 2006, Miller started fourteen consecutive games on the offensive line and the Gators posted a 12–1 record and won the BCS National Championship by defeating the Ohio State Buckeyes 41–14.  Miller graduated from Florida with a bachelor's degree in anthropology in 2008.

Professional career

Jacksonville Jaguars
Miller was signed by the Jacksonville Jaguars as an undrafted free agent in 2008, and he was a member of the Jaguars for a single season.

St. Louis Rams
In 2009 and 2010, he played for the St. Louis Rams, finishing 2010 on the practice squad. He made his debut with the Rams in 2011, but was waived on September 13.

References

Bibliography
Carlson, Norm, University of Florida Football Vault: The History of the Florida Gators, Whitman Publishing, LLC, Atlanta, Georgia (2007).  .

External links

1985 births
Living people
Sportspeople from Paducah, Kentucky
Sportspeople from Sarasota, Florida
Players of American football from Florida
American football centers
American football offensive guards
American football offensive tackles
Florida Gators football players
Jacksonville Jaguars players
Orlando Predators players
St. Louis Rams players
Riverview High School (Sarasota, Florida) alumni